Sir Harold Corti Emmerson, GCB, KCVO (7 April 1896 – 2 August 1984) was an English civil servant. He entered the civil service as a clerk before serving in the Royal Marine Artillery during the First World War. After demobilisation, he was given a post in the Ministry of Labour. He was the Chief Industrial Commissioner from 1942 to 1944 and Director-General of Manpower from 1944 to 1946 before serving as Permanent Secretary of the Ministry of Works from 1946 to 1956 and Permanent Secretary of the Ministry of Labour from 1956 to 1959.

References 

1896 births
1984 deaths
English civil servants
Knights Grand Cross of the Order of the Bath
Knights Commander of the Royal Victorian Order